An anti-fairy tale, also called anti-tale, is a fairy tale  which, unlike an ordinary one, has a tragic, rather than a happy ending, with the antagonists winning and the protagonists losing at the end of the story. Whereas fairy tales paint a magical, utopian world, anti-fairy tales paint a dark world of nastiness and cruelty. Such stories incorporate horror, black comedy, mean-spirited practical jokes on innocent characters, sudden and often cruel plot twists, and biting satire.  The term was introduced by André Jolles in his Einfache Formen (1930).

Examples of anti-fairy tales include "The Fisherman and His Wife", and "The Swineherd". A recent example is Fabien Vehlmann's graphic novel Beautiful Darkness.

The term is also used to refer to remakes of traditional "happy" fairy tales into "unhappy" ones.

See also
Anti-hero
Antinovel

References

Further reading
Lutz Röhrich, Märchen mit schlechtem Ausgang" ("Fairy Tales with Bad Ending"), In: Hessische Blätterfür Volkskunde''. 49-50 (1958) 236-248

Fairy tales